Paulistana  is the eighth studio album by Brazilian jazz pianist, composer, and singer Eliane Elias. The record was released on October 5, 1993 via Blue Note label. The side musicians for this album include her long-time collaborators: Eddie Gomez and Marc Johnson on bass, Jack Dejohnette and Peter Erskine on drums, and Nana Vasconcelos on percussion. The vocal parts were performed by herself, her daughter Amanda Elias-Brecker, and Ivan Lins.

Reception
A reviewer of Bristol Jazz Crew stated "Her favoured piano trio is the format of choice here, with Elias keen to hint at Bill Evans, as well as showcasing her own sound, with many tracks benefitting from some soulful and rhythmic percussion. On the downside, a handful of tracks also unweildily gain some of Elias’ vocals. Not to say that her voice is bad though - in fact its limited range is heightened by the warm and sensuous tone she brings to the lyrics – but its occasional lead means that her own piano playing, her greatest asset, is at times greatly reduced. A warm and enjoyable listening experience, the recasting of these classics in a jazz format is a winning success, and Elias’ own pieces here, including the title track, are also much stronger than before, blending nicely with the well-chosen covers. And even despite the small flaws, ‘Paulistana’ is a great uplifting jazz record that sits nicely in Eliane Elias’ discography." The Buffalo News review by Mary Kunz noted, "When you're as talented and good-looking a musician as she is, you can do whatever you want. Elias comes from Brazil, and her sound is rhythmic and tropical."

Track listing

Personnel
Band
 Eliane Elias – piano, synthesizer (1, 3), vocals (5, 8, 10)
 Jim Beard – synthesizer (5)
 Marc Johnson – acoustic bass (1, 3, 6, 8, 9)
 Eddie Gómez – acoustic bass (4, 5, 7)
 Peter Erskine – drums (1, 6, 8, 9)
 Portinho – drums (3)
 Jack DeJohnette – drums (4, 5, 7)
 Café – percussion (1, 3, 6) 
 Naná Vasconcelos – percussion  (9)
 Ivan Lins – vocals  (5)
 Amanda Elias Brecker – vocals  (8)

Production
 Producer and Arrangements – Eliane Elias
 Associate Producer on Tracks 4, 6, 7 & 9 – Steve Khan
 Executive Producers – Christine Martin and Hitoshi Namekata
 Mixing – Malcolm Pollack (Tracks 1, 3, 5, 8 & 10); Paul Wickliffe (Tracks 2 & 11); James Farber (Tracks 4, 6, 7 & 9).

References

External links

1993 albums
Eliane Elias albums
Blue Note Records albums